Giro d'Italia Giovani Under 23, also known as Baby Giro, Girobio or Giro Ciclistico d'Italia, is an Italian road bicycle racing amateur stage race created in 1970.

Giro d'Italia Giovani Under 23 is the most important race on Italy's U23 calendar, the analogous of the Giro d'Italia. The list of winners includes renowned riders like Francesco Moser, Marco Pantani, Gilberto Simoni, Leonardo Piepoli and Danilo Di Luca.

After the 2012 edition, the race was not held for a few years, but it was announced that in 2017 it would return as a U23 race.

Winners

References

Cycle races in Italy
Recurring sporting events established in 1970
Men's road bicycle races
1970 establishments in Italy
Amateur sports
Under-23 cycle racing